Lourdes de Agapito Vicente is the Professor of 3D Vision in the department of computer science at University College London (UCL) where she leads a research
group with a focus on 3D dynamic scene understanding from video. Agapito is an elected member of the Executive Committee of the British Machine Vision Association. Furthermore, she is the co-founder of the software company Synthesia.

Education and career 
Agapito received her Ph.D. degree in computer science from the Universidad Complutense de Madrid, Spain in 1996. She was a postdoctoral fellow in the Active Vision Lab in the Robotics Research Group at the University of Oxford from 1997 to 2000. She was awarded an EU Marie Curie Postdoctoral Research Fellowship between 1997 and 1999. In 2001, she became a lecturer at Queen Mary University of London, in 2007 a Senior Lecturer, and in 2011 a Reader in Computer Vision. In 2008, she received an ERC Starting Independent Researcher Grant for the HUMANIS (Human Motion Analysis from Image Sequences) project. In 2013, Prof. Agapito joined the Computer Science Department at University College London. In 2017, she co-founded the software company Synthesia which offers content creation tools that include video synthesis.

Research 
Her major research interests are in computer vision. In particular, her research focusses on inferring 3D information from videos recorded from a single moving camera. Agapito's early research focused on static scenes (structure from motion) but moved on to the challenging problem of estimating the 3D shape of moving non-rigid objects ("non-rigid structure from motion"). She has published numerous works on non-rigid structure from motion for deformable tracking, dense optical flow estimation, non-rigid video registration, 3D reconstruction of deformable and articulated structure, and dense 3D modelling of non-rigid dynamic scenes.

Selected awards 
 2020 Programme Chair for the British Machine Vision Conference
 2016 Programme Chair for the Conference on Computer Vision and Pattern Recognition (CVPR)
 2014 Area Chair for CVPR, European Conference on Computer Vision (ECCV), and Asian Conference on Computer Vision (ACCV). Workshops Chair for ECCV
 2008-2014 European Research Council Starting Independent Researcher Grant 
 1997-1999 EU Marie Curie Postdoctoral Research Fellowship

References 

Computer vision researchers
British women academics
Academics of University College London
Year of birth missing (living people)
Living people